Harry Snyder (1867–1927) was an American agricultural scientist, a specialist in agricultural chemistry.

Biography
Harry Snyder was born in Cherry Valley, New York on January 26, 1867. He earned a B.S. from Cornell University in 1889, where he was subsequently instructor of chemistry for two years. Snyder joined the Agricultural Experiment Station at the University of Minnesota in 1891 as a chemist, and in 1892 became professor of agricultural chemistry. He became professor of agricultural chemistry and soils in 1907. He left his professorship for industry in 1909 to become the chief chemist for the Russell-Miller Milling Company in Minneapolis.

He married Adelaide Churchill Craig in 1890.

Snyder died at his home in Minneapolis on October 11, 1927.

Snyder Hall, constructed in 1938 as the agricultural biochemistry building at the university, was named after him on the University of Minnesota St. Paul Campus. It is now the headquarters for the University of Minnesota College of Biological Sciences. He was President of the Sigma Xi Chapter there from 1907-08.

Bibliography
Among his major publications were his books:
 
 
 
 
He also wrote many papers, including:
 
 
 
 

Snyder wrote numerous Department of Agriculture Bulletins, including  United States Department of Agriculture Bulletins Nos. 67, 85, 101, 126, 143, 156, on the digestibility of bread. He also was the writer of many  technical articles for the Encyclopædia Britannica.

References

External links
 
 

American agriculturalists
Cornell University alumni
University of Minnesota people
1867 births
1927 deaths